Karl Muggeridge born 20 April 1974 in Tweed Heads, New South Wales, Australia is a former professional motorcycle racer. He is married to Isobel, and has one son, Ryan Luca.

Starting Out
After several years of Motocross, Muggas began circuit racing in 1994, finishing 4th in his homeland's 250cc series a year later on a Suzuki. Over the next 3 years he did an assortment of races around the world, primarily on 600cc Supersport bikes. He was a regular in his home series in 1996, and in the British championship for the next 2 years, coming 4th overall in 1999, before moving on to the Supersport World Championship.

Supersport World Championship

Superbike World Championship

In  a back injury caused him to miss the Valencia round and he again failed to score a podium finish, despite strong qualifying runs including 3rd at Brands Hatch. He finished the season 12th with 123 points.

He instead remained in WSBK  and on a Honda by joining countryman Josh Brookes at Alto Evolution. He missed his home race at Phillip Island after a crash in practice. At Monza he started 6th but crashed in the one race staged before heavy rain caused the event to be abandoned. The team missed Misano due to legal problems, and Brookes left the team, but Muggeridge returned at Brno. He finished the season 16th with 62 points.

For  he moved to the DFXtreme team, again on Hondas. He scored two sixth places among his fourteen points finishes, although he only scored four times in the last seven rounds, coming 15th overall.

For  he joined the Celani Suzuki team. He struggled throughout the season with his highest place finish of 8th in race 2 of the penultimate round at Magny-Cours, Karl did not race in the final round of the season. He also raced a couple of rounds in the British Superbike Championship for the HM Plant, Honda as a replacement rider for the injured Glen Richards.

IDM German Superbike Championship
For 2010 Muggeridge moved into the IDM Superbike Championship riding the Holzhauer Racing Promotion Honda, collecting a pole position and a double race win at the opening round at the Lausitzring. He also took a double race win at Nürburgring in the third round of the season. Currently Muggeridge is leading the series by 29 points with one round left to go. Muggeridge went on to win the title with a total of 244 points, 19 clear of his closest rival. Muggeridge stayed in the German championship for 2011 to defend his title, he failed to win a race in the 2011 season and ended the championship in 3rd on 200 points.
Muggeridge also had a guest ride with the Castrol Honda team in the World Superbike Championship during the last round at Portimao, finishing both races outside the points.

References

External links

 muggas.com Official website

People from New South Wales
Superbike World Championship riders
Australian motorcycle racers
1974 births
Living people
Supersport World Championship riders
British Superbike Championship riders